Bennington is an unincorporated census-designated place in Bear Lake County, Idaho, United States. As of the 2010 census, its population was 190. It is located in the southeast corner of the (State of Idaho) on U.S. Route 30 about five miles north of Montpelier and 12 miles south of Georgetown.

History
Bennington is a small farming community settled by Mormon Pioneers in 1864. It was named by Brigham Young after a town in Vermont near where he was born and grew up. Many of the inhabitants in Bennington are direct descendants of these early pioneers.

Among its founders was Amos Wright who, according to his grandson, the Bennington-born writer David L. Wright, before founding Bennington was excommunicated from the Church of Jesus Christ of Latter-day Saints for riding his horse into a meetinghouse and shooting out the lights. He was later rebaptised, before going on to found Bennington.

Bennington's population was estimated at 50 in 1909, and was 100 in 1960.

Its elevation is 6,053 ft (1,845 m).

Demographics

Notable people
John Tippets, Idaho State Senator.

References

Census-designated places in Idaho
Census-designated places in Bear Lake County, Idaho
Populated places established in 1864